Wheaton is a city in Pottawatomie County, Kansas, United States.  As of the 2020 census, the population of the city was 98.

History
The first post office in Wheaton was established in 1870, but it was called Leghorn until 1883. The post office remained in operation until it was discontinued in 1992.

Geography
Wheaton is located at  (39.502313, -96.317779).

Demographics

Wheaton is part of the Manhattan, Kansas Metropolitan Statistical Area.

2010 census
As of the census of 2010, there were 95 people, 34 households, and 24 families residing in the city. The racial makeup of the city was 97.9% White and 2.1% from other races. Hispanic or Latino of any race were 8.4% of the population.

There were 34 households, of which 35.3% had children under the age of 18 living with them, 61.8% were married couples living together, 2.9% had a female householder with no husband present, 5.9% had a male householder with no wife present, and 29.4% were non-families. 17.6% of all households were made up of individuals, and 2.9% had someone living alone who was 65 years of age or older. The average household size was 2.79 and the average family size was 3.33.

The median age in the city was 39.5 years. 33.7% of residents were under the age of 18; 4.3% were between the ages of 18 and 24; 24.2% were from 25 to 44; 24.2% were from 45 to 64; and 13.7% were 65 years of age or older. The gender makeup of the city was 51.6% male and 48.4% female.

2000 census
As of the census of 2000, there were 92 people, 34 households, and 24 families residing in the city. The racial makeup of the city was 95.65% White, 1.09% Asian, and 3.26% from two or more races.

There were 34 households, out of which 32.4% had children under the age of 18 living with them, 58.8% were married couples living together, 8.8% had a female householder with no husband present, and 29.4% were non-families. 20.6% of all households were made up of individuals, and 11.8% had someone living alone who was 65 years of age or older. The average household size was 2.71 and the average family size was 3.29.

In the city, the population was spread out, with 33.7% under the age of 18, 4.3% from 18 to 24, 30.4% from 25 to 44, 13.0% from 45 to 64, and 18.5% who were 65 years of age or older. The median age was 32 years. For every 100 females, there were 95.7 males. For every 100 females age 18 and over, there were 79.4 males.

The median income for a household in the city was $26,500, and the median income for a family was $28,750. Males had a median income of $17,917 versus $18,750 for females. The per capita income for the city was $9,402. There were 20.0% of families and 38.4% of the population living below the poverty line, including 66.0% of under eighteens and none of those over 64.

Education
The community is served by Onaga USD 322 public school district.

Notable people
 Frank Bushey, baseball player

References

Further reading

External links
 Wheaton - Directory of Public Officials
 Wheaton city map, KDOT

Cities in Pottawatomie County, Kansas
Cities in Kansas
Manhattan, Kansas metropolitan area